St. Thomas railway station may refer to:

 Canada Southern Railway Station, a former station in St. Thomas, Ontario, Canada
 Exeter St Thomas railway station, in Exeter, England
 Fontpédrouse-Saint-Thomas-les-Bains station, in Fontpédrouse, Occitanie, France
 St. Thomas Mount railway station, in Chennai, Tamil Nadu, India
 Swansea St Thomas railway station, a former station in Swansea, West Glamorgan, Wales

See also
 Saint Thomas (disambiguation)